Schistochila macrodonta is a species of liverwort in the family Schistochilaceae. It is found in Bhutan and China. Its natural habitats are temperate forests and subtropical or tropical dry forests.

References

Jungermanniales
Endangered plants
Taxonomy articles created by Polbot